Howard, also known as Burton or Westport, is an unincorporated community in Liberty Township, Parke County, in the U.S. state of Indiana.

History
Howard was named after Tilghman Howard, a U.S. Representative from Indiana.

Geography

References

Unincorporated communities in Indiana
Unincorporated communities in Parke County, Indiana